The Parliament of the Kingdom of Italy was the bicameral parliament of the Kingdom of Italy. It was established in 1861 to replace the Parliament of the Kingdom of Sardinia and lasted until 18 June 1946, when it was replaced by the present-day Italian Parliament. It was formed of a lower house (the Chamber of Deputies or after 1939 the Chamber of Fasces and Corporations) and an upper house (Senate of the Kingdom).

Bibliography
 Francesco Bartolotta (ed), Parlamenti e governi d'Italia dal 1848 al 1970, Roma, Vito Bianco Ed., 1971.

1946 disestablishments in Italy
Italian Parliament
1861 establishments in Italy
Defunct bicameral legislatures